The communauté de communes Cœur de Caux  was created on December 31, 1999, and is located in the Seine-Maritime département of the Normandy  region of northern France. It was created in December 1999. It was dissolved in January 2017.

The communauté comprised the following 22 communes:

Alvimare
Ancourteville-sur-Héricourt
Auzouville-Auberbosc
Bennetot
Bermonville
Beuzeville-la-Guérard
Cleuville
Cléville
Cliponville
Envronville
Fauville-en-Caux
Foucart
Hattenville
Normanville
Ricarville
Rocquefort
Saint-Pierre-Lavis
Sainte-Marguerite-sur-Fauville
Sommesnil
Thiouville
Trémauville
Yébleron

See also
Communes of the Seine-Maritime department

References 

Coeur de Caux